Homesick for Another World is a collection of fourteen short stories by Ottessa Moshfegh.

Contents

Reception
The review aggregator website Book Marks reported that 41% of critics gave the book a "rave" review, whilst the other 59% of the critics expressed "positive" impressions, based on a sample of 22 reviews.

Writing in The New York Times, novelist David Means wrote, "Moshfegh quickly established herself as an important new voice in the literary world, and her concerns for those isolated not only in the margins of society but within the physical confines of the body itself mirrored the work of brilliant predecessors like Mary Gaitskill, Christine Schutt and, in some ways, Eileen Myles."

Christian Lorentzen, reviewing the collection in Vulture, wrote, "The stories in Homesick for Another World are mostly marvels, but none of them are marvels of plot. Voice, mood, atmosphere, and the piercing detail are the native elements of her arsenal."

Author and Tin House co-founder Elissa Schappell, writing in The Los Angeles Times, compared Moshfegh's style to Flannery O'Connor.

References

External links
Publishers Weekly Review

2017 short story collections
American short story collections
Penguin Press books
Short story collections by Ottessa Moshfegh